Andrés Madera Delgado is a Venezuelan karateka. He won  Gold Medal in the Men's Individual -67 Kg Kumite at the 2019 XVIII Pan American Games Karate at Lima, Peru.

Career
Previously, Madera won a bronze medal in the Men's Individual -67 Kg Kumite at the 2016 Senior World Karate Championships at Linz, Austria and he won several medals, including gold, silver and bronze medals in the Pan American Games, Pan American championship, South American championship, Central American and Caribbean Games and American Centre Championships.
He also won several medals in the World Karate Federation Karate1 Premier League  and Series A Championships, and he was the 2017 GRAND WINNER of the Male Kumite -67 kg category.

Achievements 
He qualified for the 2020 Summer Olympics in Tokyo, Japan through the Continental Representation qualifying spots, where karate will be featured for the first time and now he will represent Venezuela Team at the 2020 Summer Olympics at the Karate competition of the 2020 Summer Olympics in Tokyo, Japan

References

Living people
Venezuelan male karateka
Pan American Games gold medalists for Venezuela
Pan American Games medalists in karate
South American Games medalists in karate
Karateka at the 2019 Pan American Games
Medalists at the 2019 Pan American Games
Central American and Caribbean Games gold medalists for Venezuela
Central American and Caribbean Games medalists in karate
Karateka at the 2020 Summer Olympics
Olympic karateka of Venezuela
Karateka at the 2015 Pan American Games
1988 births
21st-century Venezuelan people
South American Games gold medalists for Venezuela